James Andrisevic (born January 22, 1982) is an assistant coach for the NBA G League Santa Cruz Warriors and former professional player.

Career 
Born in Kansas City, Missouri, Andrisevic played basketball at Lee's Summit North High School in Lee's Summit, Missouri. A 6'9" power forward-center, he kicked off his college career at Johnson County Community College in 2000 and was a member of the 2001 NJCAA National Championship team, before transferring to Arizona State University in 2002. He played a total of 13 games for Arizona State tallying four points and ten rebounds.

Upon graduation 2005, Andrisevic, who earned a bachelor of arts degree in finance in 2004 and a bachelor of arts degree in marketing in 2005, took his game to Germany where he played professionally and also spent some time in Denmark.

Andrisevic served as graduate team manager and program coordinator of the men’s basketball team at Drake University from 2009 to 2011, his first head coaching position came during the 2011–12 season, when he guided the Asker Aliens of Norway’s top-flight BLNO. Under his tutelage, the Aliens reached the BLNO finals that year. Following a short stint as head coach of Slovakian side BC Prievidza, Andrisevic was named assistant coach with the Santa Cruz Warriors of the NBA D-League in 2013. He helped the Warriors win the 2015 D-League championship title and was promoted associate head coach for the 2015–16 season.

In 2016, he worked as an assistant coach at Changwon LG Sakers, followed by a one-year tenure as assistant at Kyoto Hannaryz. In 2017–18, Andrisevic served as head coach of the Hiroshima Dragonflies in the Japanese B.League. In 2019, Andrisevic returned to the Santa Cruz Warriors in an assistant coaching role and has remained there.

Head coaching record

|-
|-
| style="text-align:left;"|Hiroshima Dragonflies
| style="text-align:left;"|2017
| 17||8||9|||| style="text-align:center;"|Fired |||-||-||-||
| style="text-align:center;"|-
|-
|-

References

1982 births
Living people
American expatriate basketball people in Denmark
American expatriate basketball people in Germany
American expatriate basketball people in Japan
American expatriate basketball people in the Netherlands
American expatriate basketball people in Norway
American expatriate basketball people in Slovakia
American expatriate basketball people in South Korea
American men's basketball players
Arizona State Sun Devils men's basketball players
Drake Bulldogs men's basketball coaches
Hiroshima Dragonflies coaches
Johnson County Community College people
Junior college men's basketball players in the United States
Kyoto Hannaryz coaches
Northern Arizona Suns coaches
Santa Cruz Warriors coaches